Jeffery Wayne Bates (born September 19, 1963) is an American country music artist. Signed to RCA Nashville in late 2002, Bates released his debut album Rainbow Man in May 2003. In 2005 he released his second album, Leave the Light On, on RCA. He left RCA in 2006. This album was followed by Jeff Bates in 2008 on the independent Black River Entertainment. Bates' two RCA albums accounted for seven chart singles on the Billboard country charts, of which three reached top 40: "The Love Song" (his highest, at No. 8), "I Wanna Make You Cry" at No. 23, and "Long, Slow Kisses" at No. 17.

Biography

Jeff Bates was born in Bunker Hill, Mississippi, a community in Marion County. He went to East Marion High School in Columbia.

Musical career

Rainbow Man
Before signing to a record contract, Bates co-wrote Tracy Lawrence's 2002 single "What a Memory". Bates signed to RCA Records Nashville in 2003, releasing his debut single, "The Love Song" in December 2002. Peaking at No. 8 on the Billboard country charts, it was the first of three singles from his debut album Rainbow Man, which also produced a No. 47 in its title track and a No. 23 in "I Wanna Make You Cry". Bates co-produced the album with David Malloy, Kenny Beard, and Scott Hendricks.

Leave the Light On
His fourth single, "Long, Slow Kisses", was a re-recording of a cut from his debut album. This re-recording was the third Top 40 hit of his career, peaking at No. 17 in 2005. It was also the first of four singles from his second album, Leave the Light On. However, none of the other three singles from this album — "Good People", "No Shame" and "One Second Chance" — reached Top 40, (However, "No Shame" did reach top 40 at No. 40 for Mediabase, which is used by Bob Kingsley's "Country Top 40" show), and Bates was dropped from RCA's roster.

Jeff Bates
He signed to Black River Entertainment in 2008 and released his self-titled third album. The album's first three singles were "Don't Hate Me for Lovin' You", "Riverbank", and "One Thing".
In January 2009 he released his first Christmas single "That's What Christmas Is" with Jimmy Fortune of The Statler Brothers fame singing background vocals.

One Day Closer
Jeff's second and first EP for Black River, "One Day Closer" was released February 15, 2011.

Personal life
After signing a contract with Warner-Chappell Publishing, Bates developed a methamphetamine addiction in late 1999. To feed the drug habit, he sold everything he owned and then resorted to stealing, including a guitar from his friend Kenny Beard. On March 14, 2001, he was arrested for drug possession and grand theft. After rehabilitation and jail time, he was given a second chance and signed to RCA. The song "One Second Chance" was inspired by this part of his life.

In August 2006, a $3,500 guitar that was a gift to Bates from the Takamine guitar company and used in his video "One Second Chance" was stolen from Bates's garage. When Bates called the Nashville police, Det. Rick Mavity was sent to investigate. Mavity was the same officer involved in Bates's arrest in 2001. Mavity located the stolen guitar in a pawn shop and returned it to Bates.

In May 2007, Bates married his girlfriend, Kelly Vaughn, in an outdoor ceremony. A year later, he signed to Black River Music Group and released his self-titled third album.

Discography

Studio albums

Singles

Music videos

References

External links
 [ Jeff Bates] at Allmusic
 Official Jeff Bates website

1963 births
Living people
American country singer-songwriters
American male singer-songwriters
People from Marion County, Mississippi
RCA Records Nashville artists
Black River Entertainment artists
Singer-songwriters from Mississippi
Country musicians from Mississippi